The 1928–29 Chicago Black Hawks season was the team's third season of play. The Hawks would miss the playoffs for the second straight season.

Regular season
The team was coming off a 7–34–3 season, in which they finished in last place in the league.  The Black Hawks would let head coach Hugh Lehman go and hire Herb Gardiner to become the team's head coach.  This season was also a long one for the club, as they finished with a league worst 7–29–8 record, and 25 points out of a playoff spot.  Chicago would score an NHL record worst 33 goals, averaging less than a goal per game, while giving up 85 goals, which was the highest in the league. In one stretch from February 7 through February 28, the Hawks were shut out in eight consecutive games. Gardiner was fired after posting a 5–23–4 record, and for the remainder of the season, the Hawks used team captain Dick Irvin as a player-coach.

Due to the new Chicago Stadium, the new home of the Black Hawks, not being ready for the 1928–29 season, the team was only able to get ice time at Chicago Coliseum through January.  Chicago would then play the rest of their "home" games in Detroit, Michigan, and Fort Erie, Ontario, in February and March.

Vic Ripley would have a team-high 13 points, which included 11 goals, which was 1/3 of the Hawks goal total.  Dick Irvin would score six goals, while youngster Johnny Gottselig scored five.  Goaltender Chuck Gardiner saw all the action in net, winning seven games, while posting a 1.85 GAA and earning five shutouts.

While they improved by their point total by five points over the previous season, they still were a long way from contending for a playoff spot.

November
The Black Hawks opened the 1928–29 season on a two-game road trip. In their season opener on November 15 in Toronto, the Black Hawks were shut out by the Toronto Maple Leafs by a score of 2–0. Two nights later, Chicago would lose to the Montreal Maroons 4–2 in Montreal. The club played their first home game of the season on November 20, as Chicago was shut out by the Pittsburgh Pirates 2–0. Two nights later, on November 22, the Black Hawks' losing streak extended to four games, as the New York Rangers narrowly defeated Chicago by a 2–1 score.

Chicago would finally earn a point in their fifth game of the season, tying the Boston Bruins 1–1 on November 25. The Hawks would close out November with an overtime loss to the New York Rangers.

Chicago opened the season with a 0–5–1 record in November, sitting in last place in the American Division. Chicago was eight points behind the division leading New York Rangers, and three points behind the Pittsburgh Pirates for fourth place.

December
The club snapped their winless skid, which if you include the final 10 games of the 1927–28 season, had extended to 16 games, with a 3–2 victory over the Pittsburgh Pirates in Pittsburgh. Chicago would drop their next two games on the road against the Ottawa Senators and Montreal Canadiens before returning home.

On December 11, the Black Hawks recorded their first home victory of the season, defeating the Ottawa Senators 2–1. The Black Hawks would follow up by being shutout in their next two games, losses to the New York Americans and Montreal Canadiens.

The Black Hawks faced the Boston Bruins in Boston for a Christmas Day game, as Chicago defeated the Bruins 2–1. The road trip continued into New York on two nights later, as Chicago won consecutive games for the first time all season, defeating the New York Americans 2–0. The road trip concluded in Detroit, as the Black Hawks lost to the Detroit Cougars in their final game of the month.

Chicago posted a record of 4–5–0 in December, bringing their overall win–loss record to 4–10–1, earning nine points, and remaining in last place in the American Division. The Black Hawks were 12 points behind the first place New York Rangers, and three points behind the Pittsburgh Pirates to get out of the division cellar.

January
The Black Hawks slumped to begin the New Year, losing their first four games of January, which extended their overall losing streak to five games. On January 10, Chicago ended the losing skid with a 1–1 tie against the Montreal Maroons. Three nights later, the Black Hawks tied their second straight game, this time with a 1–1 score against the Pittsburgh Pirates, extending their winless skid to seven games.

Following the two tie games, the Black Hawks would lose their next three games, being shutout in each game. On January 22, the Black Hawks broke the shutout streak with a goal against the Ottawa Senators, however, the winless skid continued, as the Hawks and Senators tied 1–1. Chicago would conclude the month with another three game losing streak, scoring only one goal in those three games.

The Hawks finished January winless, as they finished the month with a 0–10–3 record. At the end of the month, the Hawks win–loss record was 4–20–4, earning only 12 points, as they had the worst record in the NHL.

February
The winless streak continued at the start of February, as the Black Hawks lost 3–2 to the New York Rangers on February 2, extending the streak to 15 games. Three nights later, on February 5, the Black Hawks finally returned to the win column, as they shutout the Detroit Cougars 1–0, earning their first victory since December 27.

Following the win over the Cougars, the Black Hawks would not score another goal for the entire month. Chicago would be shutout in each of the next eight games, earning a 0–6–2 record over those games, as they twice played in 0–0 tie games. This would set an NHL record for most consecutive games being shutout, constituting 581:42 of game time without a goal.

Chicago earned a record of 1–7–2 in February, as they scored only three goals for the entire month. Overall, the Hawks win–loss record at the end of the month was 5–27–6, earning 16 points on the season, and remaining in last place in the league.

March
The Black Hawks opened March by finally snapping their goalless drought and ending their eight game winless streak, as Chicago defeated the Montreal Maroons 2–1 on March 2. Three nights later, the Black Hawks lost a close game to the Pittsburgh Pirates by a 3–2 score in overtime.

In their final two home games of the season, the Black Hawks tied the Toronto Maple Leafs and ended their home schedule on a winning note, as they defeated the Pittsburgh Pirates 1–0 on March 10.

On March 12, the Black Hawks set a team record for goals against, as the Boston Bruins crushed Chicago by a score of 11–1. The season concluded two nights later, as Chicago tied the New York Rangers 1–1.

The Black Hawks earned a record of 2–2–2 in six games in March, which was the teams only non-losing monthly record during the season. The Black Hawks record of 7–29–8 earned the team 22 points, which ranked them in last in the NHL, four points behind the Pittsburgh Pirates.

Final standings

Record vs. opponents

Schedule and results

Regular season

 Game played at Detroit Olympia due to negotiation disputes with their home arena, the Chicago Coliseum.
 Game played at Peace Bridge Arena due to negotiation disputes with their home arena, the Chicago Coliseum.
 Game played at Windsor Arena due to negotiation disputes with their home arena, the Chicago Coliseum.

Season stats

Scoring leaders

Goaltending

Awards and records

Transactions

See also
 1928–29 NHL season

References

SHRP Sports
The Internet Hockey Database
National Hockey League Guide & Record Book 2007

Chicago Blackhawks seasons
Chicago
Chicago